At-Tahur Limited is a Pakistani public limited company based in Lahore. It is engaged in the production and processing of milk and dairy products under the brand name of Premá.

History
The company was incorporated as a private limited company in March 2007. It was subsequently converted into an unlisted public limited company with effect from September 2015. On 30 July 2018, the company was successful in getting a listing on the Pakistan Stock Exchange.

The company maintains a factory and dairy farm in Kasur and has in excess of 2000 milk-producing animals. Its corporate headquarters are located in Garden Town, Lahore.

Products
At-Tahur markets its range of dairy products under the brand name of Premá. These include pasteurized milk, yogurt, chocolate milk, raita and milk smoothies. The flagship product of the company is pasteurized milk, which accounts for 72% of its sales, and is the segment in which the company retains market dominance. Pasteurized milk is followed by yogurt variants, which combine to give 20% of the company's sales.

References

External links
http://www.at-tahur.com

Dairy products companies of Pakistan
Companies based in Lahore
Companies listed on the Pakistan Stock Exchange
2007 establishments in Pakistan